The Ukraine men's national under-18 ice hockey team is the men's national under-18 ice hockey team of Ukraine. The team is controlled by the Ice Hockey Federation of Ukraine, a member of the International Ice Hockey Federation. The team represents Ukraine at the IIHF World U18 Championships.

International competitions

IIHF World U18 Championships

1999: 1st place
2000: 9th place
2001: 10th place
2002: 12th place
2003: 6th in Division I Group B
2004: 1st in Division II Group A
2005: 3rd in Division I Group B
2006: 5th in Division I Group B
2007: 5th in Division I Group B
2008: 5th in Division I Group A

2009: 5th in Division I Group A
2010: 2nd in Division II Group B
2011: 1st in Division II Group B
2012: 4th in Division I Group B
2013: 5th in Division I Group B
2014: 5th in Division I Group B
2015: 4th in Division I Group B
2016: 3rd in Division I Group B
2017: 5th in Division I Group B
2018: 1st in Division I Group B

External links
Ukraine at IIHF.com

I